Toby Carvery is a British carvery chain brand owned and operated by Mitchells & Butlers, which consists of 158 restaurants.

History
Toby Carvery as a brand was founded as part of Bass Charrington in 1985. The parent company subsequently rebranded as Six Continents plc, before the former Bass pub estate was spun off into Mitchells & Butlers.

Menu
As well as carvery meat, the chain offers vegetarian and vegan food and fish main courses. A breakfast menu is available at some sites.

References

External links
 Official website
 

Mitchells & Butlers
Restaurant groups in the United Kingdom